Shojaabad or Shojaabad may refer to:
Shojaabad, East Azerbaijan
Shojaabad, Golestan
Shojaabad, Kashan, Isfahan Province
Shojaabad, Kerman
Shojaabad, Rafsanjan, Kerman Province
Shojaabad-e Mohammad Ali, Kerman Province
Shojaabad-e Pain
Shojaabad, Kurdistan
Shojaabad, Kurdistan (second village)
Shojaabad, Lorestan